Trois is a 2000 erotic thriller film directed by Rob Hardy and produced by William Packer. It stars Gary Dourdan, Kenya Moore and Gretchen Palmer. The film was given a limited theatrical release and was one of the years highest grossing African American films as well as one of the top fifty highest grossing independent films of 2000. The film was followed by two sequels, Trois 2: Pandora's Box (2002) and Trois: The Escort (2004).

Synopsis
Jermaine Davis (Dourdan) is a young attorney who is newly married and has recently moved to Atlanta, Georgia with his lovely and supportive wife Jasmine (Moore). While becoming settled into the new city and job, Jermaine becomes bored with his seemingly mundane lifestyle at home. He asks his wife to engage in a ménage à trois with another woman, in order to generate more excitement within their relationship and she reluctantly agrees.

Once they've committed the act, Jermaine begins to feel the insecurities of bringing a stranger into his marriage. As a result, he attempts to sever all ties with the woman. Unfortunately, it proves more complicated to remove this person from their lives and he realizes that his curiosity has thrown him into battle with a dangerous lunatic and may cost him his marriage.

Cast
Gary Dourdan as Jermaine Davis
Kenya Moore as Jasmine Davis
Gretchen Palmer as Jade Owens
Bryce Wilson as Robert
Chrystale Wilson as Tammy
Soloman K. Smith as Terrance/Eric
Thom Byrd as Thomas
Donna Biscoe as Ms. Paul

Reception
The Toledo Blade gave Trois two stars, criticizing the film as not being able to decide whether it wanted to be a "serious artistic endeavor" or a "cheap thrill" and suffering as a result.

Sequels
Two further films were produced in the film series, Pandora's Box and The Escort. Neither film was a direct sequel to the first film and Pandora's Box was not filmed with the intent of creating it as a part of the Trois film series. Critical reception for the second film in the series was poor.

References

External links
 
 

2000 films
African-American films
2000s erotic thriller films
American erotic thriller films
Films produced by Will Packer
Rainforest Films films
2000s English-language films
2000s American films